John Francis McCarthy (born 1938)  was Dean of Clogher from 1989  until 1994.

He was educated at Trinity College, Dublin and ordained in 1963. After  curacies in Seapatrick and Seagoe he held  incumbencies at Dundalk  and Enniskillen  until his time as Dean.

References

Irish Anglicans
1938 births
Alumni of Trinity College Dublin
Deans of Clogher
Living people